Conway Scenic Railroad (Canadian National) No. 7470 is a preserved class "O-18-a" 0-6-0 "Switcher" type steam locomotive at the Conway Scenic Railroad in North Conway, New Hampshire.

History

Revenue service 
The locomotive was built by the Grand Trunk Railway at Pointe-Saint-Charles, Montreal, Quebec, in June 1921. The Grand Trunk classified the switcher as F9 Class and numbered it as No. 1795. When the Canadian National Railway absorbed the Grand Trunk in 1923, they reclassified it as an O-18-a and renumbered it as No. 7470.

Preservation 
After its retirement in 1960, the engine was spared scrapping by being sold to Canada Dominion Sugar, where it spent some additional years as a switcher and was renumbered as No. 303. In May 1963, it was purchased by the Ontario government for a transportation museum that never came to fruition. In 1965, it was sold to a man named Charles Weber, who had the engine placed in storage in Wallaceburg, Ontario, for several years untouched. It was later purchased by a rail collector named Fred Stock, with the engine put in storage at the Canadian National rail yard in Sarnia. In April 1968, Stock sold the engine to Dwight Smith.

Excursion service 
Smith was working on founding the Conway Scenic Railroad, which opened in 1974. After purchasing the engine, it was moved to Rigby Yard in South Portland, Maine, in October 1968. After sitting in Portland for three years, it was moved to North Conway, New Hampshire, in 1971, were it went through a three-year restoration. Subsequently, the locomotive returned to active service on August 3, 1974, and was renumbered as Conway Scenic No. 47, making its excursion return run on August 4, 1974. It was the new railroad's only locomotive in its earliest years. The engine was renumbered back to No. 7470 and the Canadian National paint scheme were restored in 1989, according to Railfan & Railroad magazine.

Today, the engine mainly operates in the mid-September and October seasons, for Railfans' Weekend, and for Steam in the Snow in January, where it is hosted by the Mass Bay Railroad Enthusiasts. It used to run during summer months as well, but ended in 2007, excluding special excursions. No. 7470 has also pulled the Notch Train on rare occasions for special events, once each in 2007 and 2011, and twice in 2019.

In July 2014, it was announced that the locomotive was going to be coming out of service due to a major federally mandated inspection and overhaul. The engine ran its last train on January 3, 2015, and its overhaul work began the following day. It returned to active service on June 1, 2019, and made its first test runs under its own power for the first time in four years. The locomotive made its excursion return on June 29, 2019.

No. 7470 made another Notch appearance on September 1, 2019. It pulled its first Steam in the Snow event since 2015 on January 4, 2020. No. 7470 was being prepared for the 2021 season for the engine's 100th birthday and was to see operation for most of the season, from June through December but due to work to be done to the engine, the plans were cancelled. The Conway Scenic Railroad has hosted its own Winter Steam event since the annual Massachusetts Bay Railroad Enthusiasts event was cancelled due to Massachusetts-New Hampshire travel restrictions.

Accident 
On the morning of January 3, 2022 at 4:44am, a radio inside 7470's cab caught fire, and it caused the inside of the locomotive's cab to burn up as well. The fire also damaged the spring in the whistle valve, causing the whistle to release a valve sound, which alerted the nearby steam locomotive mechanic, who called 9-1-1. The nearby fire department arrived shortly afterward to put the fire out. Had it not been for the whistle valve blowing itself, the 1874-built roundhouse it was stored in would have received critical fire damage and collapsed onto 7470. The cab has since been repaired and the engine returned to service in June 2022.

In popular culture
In 1972, the engine made its first ever film appearance in the Paramount Pictures film, A Separate Peace, lettered as Boston & Maine 47.

References

Further reading

External links
 Conway Scenic Railroad - Official site
 RR Picture Archives - CN 7470

Preserved steam locomotives of Canada
Grand Trunk Railway
7470
0-6-0 locomotives
Standard gauge locomotives of Canada
Railway locomotives introduced in 1921
Standard gauge locomotives of the United States
Preserved steam locomotives of New Hampshire